Languriini is a tribe of lizard beetles in the family Erotylidae, subfamily Languriinae. There are about 5 genera and at least 20 described species in Languriini.

ITIS Taxonomic note:
Authorship corrected to Hope 1840, per Bouchard et al., (2011:357), 'family-group name previously attributed to Crotch (1873c) by Pakaluk et al. (1994) and subsequent authors'.

Genera
These five genera belong to the tribe Languriini:
 Acropteroxys Gorham, 1887 i c g b
 Dasydactylus Gorham, 1887 i c g b
 Languria Latreille, 1802 i c g b
 Langurites Motschulsky, 1860 i c g b
 Neoloberolus Leschen, 2003 i c g
Data sources: i = ITIS, c = Catalogue of Life, g = GBIF, b = Bugguide.net

References

Further reading

External links

 

Erotylidae
Articles created by Qbugbot